A glint is a short flash of light. Glint or Glints may also refer to:

 the reflection of the cornea; see Purkinje images
 Glints (platform), a Singaporean online talent recruitment platform

Music 
 Glint (band), the project of American musician Jase Blankfort
 Glints (musician), a Flemish hip hop artist